Deins Kaņepējs (born 5 October 1995 in Pļaviņas) is a Latvian cyclist, who last rode for UCI Continental team .

Major results
2015
 3rd Road race, National Under-23 Road Championships
2016
 4th Memoriał Romana Siemińskiego
 9th Overall Tour of China II
2017
 2nd Overall Tour of Estonia
 4th Road race, National Road Championships

References

External links

1995 births
Living people
Latvian male cyclists